In taxonomy, the Ferroplasmaceae are a family of the Thermoplasmatales.

References

Further reading

Scientific journals

Scientific books

Scientific databases

External links

Archaea taxonomic families
Euryarchaeota